Splash page may refer to:

 Splash page (comics), a comic book page that is mostly or entirely taken up by a single image or panel
 A splash screen on a website or software

See also
 Splash (disambiguation)
 Page (disambiguation)